Kharlamovo is a rural locality (a village) in Vakhromeyevskoye Rural Settlement, Kameshkovsky District, Vladimir Oblast, Russia. The population was 23 as of 2010.

Geography 
Kharlamovo is located on the Talsha River, 18 km north of Kameshkovo (the district's administrative centre) by road. Krasnoznamensky is the nearest rural locality.

References 

Rural localities in Kameshkovsky District